Locomotivas (Eng: Locomotives) is a Brazilian telenovela produced and broadcast by TV Globo. It premiered on 1 March 1977 and ended on 12 September 1977, with a total of 168 episodes. It's the nineteenth "novela das sete" to be aired at the timeslot. It is created by  Cassiano Gabus Mendes and directed by Régis Cardoso.

Cast

References

External links 
 

1977 telenovelas
TV Globo telenovelas
Brazilian telenovelas
1977 Brazilian television series debuts
1977 Brazilian television series endings
Portuguese-language telenovelas